St Andrews in Fife was a royal burgh that returned one commissioner to the Parliament of Scotland and to the Convention of Estates.

After the Acts of Union 1707, St Andrews, Cupar, Dundee, Forfar and Perth formed the Perth district of burghs, returning one member between them to the House of Commons of Great Britain.

List of burgh commissioners

 1661–63: Andrew Carstairs, dean of guild 
 1665 convention: Robert Lentron, provost 
 1667 convention, 1669–74, 1678 convention: John Geddie of St Nicholas, provost 
 1681–82, 1685–86: John Aesone, former provost 
 1689 convention, 1689–1702: James Smith, merchant 
 1702–07: Alexander Warson of Aithernie

References

See also
 List of constituencies in the Parliament of Scotland at the time of the Union

Constituencies of the Parliament of Scotland (to 1707)
Politics of Fife
History of Fife
Constituencies disestablished in 1707
1707 disestablishments in Scotland